Karen McCarthy Woolf (born 1966) is a poet of English and Jamaican parentage.

Background
Karen McCarthy Woolf was born in London to English and Jamaican parents. Her father emigrated to the United Kingdom in 1957 as a part of the Windrush generation, and her experience and identity as a mixed-race woman has informed her poetry.

The poem "Outside" from her Seasonal Disturbances was chosen by Carol Rumens as "Poem of the Week" in The Guardian in December 2017.

In 2019, McCarthy Woolf was appointed Poet in Residence at University of California, Los Angeles. She is a contributor to the 2019 anthology New Daughters of Africa, edited by Margaret Busby.

McCarthy Woolf won second place in the 2020 Laurel Prize for her collection Seasonal Disturbances.

In 2021 she was one of the judges of the 2020 National Poetry Competition.

McCarthy Woolf was mentored on The Complete Works poets of colour mentoring scheme initiated by Bernardine Evaristo to redress representational invisibility. The scheme (2007–2017), funded by Arts Council England, was directed by Dr Natalie Teitler, during which time thirty poets were mentored.

Selected publications

Authored
The Worshipful Company of Pomegranate Slicers (2006, Spread The Word)
An Aviary of Small Birds (2014, Carcanet Press)
Seasonal Disturbances (2017, Carcanet)

Edited
Bittersweet: Contemporary Black Women's Poetry (1998, The Women's Press)
Ten: The New Wave (2014, Bloodaxe Books)
Ten: Poets of the New Generation (2017, Bloodaxe)
Unwritten : Caribbean Poems after the First World War  (2018, Nine Arches Press)

References

External links

"Karen McCarthy Woolf In conversation with Forward Arts Foundation"
Interview with Karen McCarthy Woolf by The Poetry Extension

21st-century English poets
21st-century English women writers
1966 births
Black British women writers
English people of Jamaican descent
English women poets
Living people
Women anthologists